Konkani cinema is an Indian film industry, where films are made in the Konkani language, which is spoken mainly in the Indian states of Goa, Maharashtra and Karnataka and to a smaller extent in Kerala. The films have been produced in Goa, Karnataka, Maharashtra and Kerala.

As of 2018, when the Indian film industry celebrated its centennial, a total of 145 feature films were released. This was another increase over a total films made until 2009 as documented by Isidore Dantas in  his book Konkani Cholchitram.

The first full-length Konkani film was Sukhi Konn produced by GMB Rodrigues in 1949 but was never released. Mogacho Anvddo, was released on 24 April 1950, and was produced and directed by Jerry Braganza, a native of Mapusa, under the banner of ETICA Pictures. Hence, 24 April is celebrated as Konkani Film Day.
In 2008–09, Jojo Dsouza, a native of Goa began the first small scale digital film training academy in the state. He drew inspiration from noted film genius Ashok Miranda.

Konkani film Paltadcho manis has been included in the world's best films of 2009 list.

Konkani films are eligible for the National Film Award for Best Feature Film in Konkani. The most commercially successful Konkani film (as of June 2011) is O Maria directed by Rajendra Talak.

In 2012, a new age digital film The Victim was directed by Milroy Goes.

Some old Konkani films are Sukhachem Sopon, Amchem Noxib, Nirmonn, Mhoji Ghorkarn, Kortubancho Sonvsar, Jivit Amchem Oxem, Mog ani Moipas, Bhuierantlo Munis, Suzanne, Boglantt, Padri and Bhogsonne. Ujwadu is a 2011 Konkani film directed by Kasargod Chinna and produced by KJ Dhananjaya and Anuradha Padiyar.

Numerous short films have been made in Konkani such as Cheddum...the Girl by Sharon Mazarello., Sin, by Ramprasad Adpaikar.

The film In Search of Mother was one of the first completely digital Konkani films. It was co-produced by the ESG and JoJo Dsouza and directed by Ramprasad Adpaikar with production at RJ Films, Goa. Post-production was also done at RJ films studio.

Goa's first 24x7 Digital Film and Media Production house BIG BANNER ENTERTAINMENT AND MEDIA LLP was founded by Mr. Deepak A. Bandekar, Mrs. Chandan D. Bandekar and Smt. Deepa A. Bandekar in collaboration with Mr. Jojo JF D'Souza and his team. This state of the art studio was inaugurated by noted film personality Mr. Manoj Pawha and Mr. Rajendra Talak, Writer, Director, Film-maker, in December in December 2017. The studio  has complete production and post production facilities that are globally accepted in sound, video and film as well as print and publishing. Big Banner Entertainment and Media LLP also recently worked successfully on a project with Sony Music Entertainment and Disney which is a big achievement for the small industry in Goa. They are currently expanding to Line Production and boosting the film capabilities in the state of Goa.

List of Konkani Movies

 Goan dialects
 Southern Saraswat dialect
 Mangalorean Catholic dialect
 Mixed dialects

References

Bibliography 
 Konknni Cholchitram, Isidore Dantas, 2010
 50 Years of Konkani Cinema, Andrew Greno Viegas, 2000

 
 
Culture of Goa
Cinema by language of India
Cinema of Karnataka
Konkani